Danny Nir'on (born 24 January 1971) is an Israeli former footballer. His parents were Danish Jews that left Denmark for Israel.

On November 23, 2009 he resigned after his team Hapoel Petah Tikva had loss
7-1 to Hapoel Tel Aviv.

Honours
Toto Cup (2):
1989-90, 1990–91

External links
Profile at HPT.co.il

1971 births
Living people
Israeli Jews
Israeli footballers
Hapoel Petah Tikva F.C. players
Hapoel Haifa F.C. players
Hapoel Be'er Sheva F.C. players
Hapoel Tzafririm Holon F.C. players
Hapoel Petah Tikva F.C. managers
Hakoah Amidar Ramat Gan F.C. managers
Israeli Premier League managers
Footballers from Petah Tikva
Israeli people of Danish-Jewish descent
Association football forwards
Israeli football managers